Deca or DECA may refer to:

 deca- (prefix)
 deca-, a metric prefix
 Nandrolone, the active ingredient in the steroid Deca-Durabolin, commonly referred to as Deca
 Decabromodiphenyl ether, an organic compound
 Deca-press, Moldavian news agency
 Deca (journalism collective), a journalism cooperative 
 Deca i Sunce (Children and the Sun) album by the Serbian hip-hop artist Marčelo 
 Deca Sports sports video game for the Wii
 Decas (album), compilation album by the American metal band As I Lay Dying

People
Charles Decas American politician

Acronyms
 DECA Ontario
 DECA (organization), a business-marketing student organization
 Defense Commissary Agency
 Defence Electronics and Components Agency
 DECA, an abbreviation for the Decathlon or Super Decathlon light aircraft by Champion Aircraft Corporation

See also
 Deka (disambiguation)
 Decca (disambiguation)
 Dalton (disambiguation)